Potentilla sterilis, also called strawberryleaf cinquefoil  or barren strawberry, is a perennial herbaceous species of flowering plant in the rose family, Rosaceae. It is native to Europe.

Description 
The plant looks rather like wild woodland strawberry (Fragaria vesca), or a cultivated strawberry, but is a smaller plant, with smaller flowers, and it does not form fleshy fruit. After the petals have fallen from a flower no obvious fruit forms. The petals are usually well separated from one another, not overlapping as in Fragaria vesca. Another distinguishing feature, illustrated in the photograph at left, is that the terminal tooth of the leaflets is usually shorter than the adjacent teeth and the leaves are matt and darker green.

References 

sterilis
Potentilla sterilis